The Rianbavy Falls is a waterfall in the region of Ihorombe in Madagascar.

They are situated on the Zomandao River in the Andringitra Massif near the Andringitra National Park.

At a distance of less than one km from these falls, there are also the Riandahy Falls

References

Waterfalls of Madagascar
Ihorombe